McKenna DeBever (born 5 June 1996) is an American-Peruvian swimmer. She competed in the women's 200 metre freestyle event at the 2017 World Aquatics Championships. She represented Peru at the 2019 World Aquatics Championships held in Gwangju, South Korea. She competed in the women's 200 metre individual medley where she did not advance to compete in the semi-finals.

Born in Los Angeles, she was raised in Denver and competed at the collegiate level for Texas A&M.

References

External links
 
 Texas A&M Aggies bio

1996 births
Living people
Swimmers from Los Angeles
Sportspeople from Denver
American female medley swimmers
American sportspeople of Peruvian descent
Citizens of Peru through descent
Peruvian female medley swimmers
American female freestyle swimmers
Peruvian female freestyle swimmers
Peruvian people of American descent
Sportspeople of American descent
South American Games bronze medalists for Peru
South American Games medalists in swimming
Competitors at the 2018 South American Games
Swimmers at the 2015 Pan American Games
Swimmers at the 2019 Pan American Games
Pan American Games competitors for Peru
Texas A&M Aggies women's swimmers
Swimmers at the 2020 Summer Olympics
Olympic swimmers of Peru
Auburn Tigers women's swimmers